Rosenbergia schmitti is a species of beetle in the family Cerambycidae. It was described by Rigout in 1981.

References

Batocerini
Beetles described in 1981